= FARSIDE telescope =

Lunar interferometric array

FARSIDE (Farside Array for Radio Science Investigations of the Dark Ages and Exoplanets) is a concept for a low-frequency interferometric array that would be placed on the farside of the Moon.

== FarView ==
FarView is another concept for a 20x20 km radio observatory with a total collecting area of 400 kilometers that would also be located on the Moon's far side.
